The Derek Trucks Band was an American blues rock group founded by young slide guitar prodigy Derek Trucks, who began playing guitar and touring with some of blues and rock music's elite when he was just nine years old. After experimenting as an adolescent with musicians he met between tours and recording sessions, Trucks founded The Derek Trucks Band in 1994. With family ties to The Allman Brothers Band, Trucks continued to experiment and play with others, carefully assembling his own band over a period of several years. Led by Trucks and loosely based in his family home in Jacksonville, Florida, the band generally consisted of six members.

The band drew upon the wide variety of the influences and musical preferences of its band members. Together, they have gained increasing public notice and critical acclaim for developing a unique sound of their own. Melding together blues, southern rock, jazz, rhythm and blues, gospel, soul, funk with Hindustani classical music, afro-beat and world fusion, the band has released six studio albums, two live albums, and a live DVD. The bandmates have combined their talents to perform pieces from some of the most highly regarded musicians before them, while at the same time collaborating on writing the songs they have recorded. The band's eclectic sound is a way for Trucks to explore his own creativity alongside his role as a guest, and eventually a permanent member, in The Allman Brothers Band.

History
The Derek Trucks Band was founded by Trucks in 1994, with the introduction of Todd Smallie, an Atlanta jazz and blues-based musician playing bass guitar. As the first to join him, Trucks has said he feels that he's "kind of grown up with him."

The next year, in 1995, Smallie was followed by drummer Yonrico Scott, who initially filled the role of percussionist, as well as drummer, completing the band's first cohesive rhythm section. Scott began learning to play the drums when still a very young child. Originating in Michigan, with a Motown influence, he graduated from the University of Kentucky with a B.A. Degree in percussion performance. His songwriting collaborations with other band members appear from their first eponymous debut album in 1997, followed with Out of the Madness in 1999, and have continued to date. Scott has been playing with Trucks for over 17 years as of 2009. According to  Trucks: "We've developed a kind of 'musical ESP'.. it's nice to have somebody that you don't have to look at...he's just right there with you."

Trucks continued to gather a steady group of talented musicians together, although two early members did not last. The band's initial keyboardist/vocalist, Bill McKay, left his mark in songwriting credits on the band's earliest albums.

Upon finding an opening for a keyboardist, the bandmates felt fortunate to find Kofi Burbridge, (brother of bass guitarist Oteil Burbridge, with whom Trucks plays in the Allman Brothers Band) to fill the role. Kofi Burbridge is a classically trained multi-instrumentalist, and contributed to his versatility with keyboards, organ, flute, and backing vocals, in addition to his songwriting. Burbridge joined the band in 1999. In an interview upon the release of their 2002 album, Joyful Noise, Trucks commented "Kofi Burbridge has been with us maybe 2-3 years, and he's one of the few musical geniuses that I've had the chance to work with..." continuing, "I'm really anxious to see in the next few years to see where he takes this, because he's definitely a huge part of what's going on right now."

In 2002 the band's producers, Craig Street and John Snyder recommended singer Mike Mattison to the band.

Mattison performed several shows with the band, and Trucks decided Mattison's soulful voice and calm stage presence completed the band's identity. Trucks said of Mattison, "He's got a huge range, so that helps us out a lot when we stretch into some of the different material we cover. It's like having three different vocalists onstage at times. It's a tough piece of the puzzle to find, you know -- a good singer who fits with what you're doing -- so we were very fortunate to hook up with Mike."

Mattison has collaborated with Trucks writing songs, on each album since joining the band, including the title track to the band's 2008 album, Already Free.
Mattison had a previous band as well—a vocal duo, called Scrapomatic, with guitarist/vocalist Paul Olsen, with whom he still performs at occasional gigs, including some opening sets for The Derek Trucks Band.

The band's final member, Count M'Butu was the only band member that did not appear on every tour. M'Butu, the group's eldest member, played a variety of drums and percussion. Trucks and Scott both have known him for decades, before he joined the Derek Trucks Band, as M'Butu was a regular musical fixture in Atlanta; one of the bastions of the Allman Brothers fan bases. Thus, as of early 2009, M'Butu was the eldest member of the band, which has members whose ages are in their 20s, 30s 40s 50s and 60s. M'Butu has a great deal of African influence in his work, but lived in Sandersville, Georgia most of his life, "so he's got that Southern thing, too", Trucks concluded. His differing influences are compatible with the band's world music sound.

Since the last members joined in 2002, the bandmates have adjusted to near-constant travelling on the road, and have become comfortable with one another. Each member's experiences, tastes, and differing approaches to each piece are a bonus, says Mattison. Since the band embraces improvisation and musical exploration, he has said, "You're just part of the ensemble -- you do your bit and step back and let everybody else do theirs. It's fun to not have to carry the weight of the entertainer."

The band's album, Already Free, won the Grammy Award for Best Contemporary Blues Album at the 52nd Grammy Awards. That summer they released their live album, Roadsongs. In 2011, the band got a Blues Music Award as Band of the Year.

The Derek Trucks Band would occasionally play together with the band of Trucks' wife, Susan Tedeschi, in a collective known as "Soul Stew Revival".  This allowed the couple to spend more time with each other when they would otherwise both be out on the road separately. Trucks and Tedeschi formed a new group called the Tedeschi Trucks Band, with Mike Mattison and the Kofi Burbridge both joining from the Derek Trucks Band. As a result, the Derek Trucks Band has been on hiatus since 2010. Kofi Burbridge and Yonrico Scott both died in 2019. Count M'Butu died in 2021.

Personnel
Current members
 Derek Trucks – Guitar, slide guitar, sarod, dobro (1994–present)
 Todd Smallie – bass backing vocals (1994–present)
 Mike Mattison – lead vocals (2002–present)

Former members
Yonrico Scott – drums, percussion, vocals (1995–2019; his death)
Kofi Burbridge – keyboards, flute, vocals (1999–2019; his death)
 Bill Mckay – keyboards, vocals (1995–1999)
 Javier Colon – lead vocals (2000–2002)
 Count M'Butu – percussion, including a variety of drums (2004–2021; his death)

Discography
 The Derek Trucks Band (1997)
 Out of the Madness (1998)
 Joyful Noise (2002)
 Soul Serenade (2003)
 Live at Georgia Theatre (2004)
 Songlines (2006)
 Songlines Live (2006, DVD)
 Already Free (2009)
 Roadsongs (2010)

References

External links

 The Official Derek Trucks website
 
 Derek Trucks Band collection at the Internet Archive's live music archive
 Derek & Susan: It's a Family Thing article/interview from Jambase.com

1994 establishments in Florida
2010 disestablishments in Florida
Southern rock musical groups from Jacksonville
American blues musical groups
American blues rock musical groups
American world music groups
Columbia Records artists
Grammy Award winners
Jam bands
Musical groups established in 1994
Musical groups disestablished in 2010